Area code 869 is the local telephone area code of Saint Kitts and Nevis.  The 869 area code was created during a split from the original (809) area code which began permissive dialing on 1 October 1996 and ended 31 March 1997.

When in Saint Kitts and Nevis, only seven-digit dialing is needed. When calling to Saint Kitts and Nevis from anywhere in the United States or Canada 1 + (869) + the seven digits needs to be dialed, i.e. 1 + 869 555 1212.

See also

List of NANP area codes
North American Numbering Plan
Area codes in the Caribbean

External links
North American Numbering Plan Administrator
List of exchanges from AreaCodeDownload.com, 869 Area Code

869
Communications in Saint Kitts and Nevis